Karimun may refer to the following places in Indonesia:

 Great Karimun or Karimun Besar, an island of Indonesia, in the Strait of Malacca southwest of Singapore
 Little Karimun or Karimun Kecil, a smaller island just northeast of Great Karimun
 Karimun Regency, an administrative division of Indonesia, including Great and Little Karimun
 Karimun Jawa, a group of small islands off the north coast of Java

See also 
 Suzuki Karimun, an automobile model